Dilanchi Arkhi-ye Sofla (also Romanized as Dīlānchī Arkhī-ye Soflá) is a village in Solduz Rural District, in the Central District of Naqadeh County, West Azerbaijan Province, Iran. At the 2006 census, its population was 455, in 85 families.

References 

Populated places in Naqadeh County